Cinema Papers was an Australian bi-monthly film magazine which ran from 1974 to 2001. It absorbed Filmviews in 1989.

History and profile
Cinema Papers was first published as a nationally distributed magazine in January 1974. The name was derived, via a single issue magazine produced by students at La Trobe University in October 1967, from the influential French journal Cahiers du Cinéma.

The magazine was published on a bimonthly basis and had its headquarters in Melbourne. One of the owners was MTV Publishing Ltd.

In 1989 Cinema Papers absorbed another film magazine, Filmviews, but declining sales saw the magazine end in 1999. 

It was relaunched by Niche Media in April 2000 with Michaela Boland as its editor. However, this ultimately proved unsuccessful and the magazine shut for good in 2001. Digitised versions of Cinema Papers are available from the University of Wollongong's archival collection.

Contributing writers and editors included filmmakers Scott Murray, Philippe Mora and Antony I. Ginnane.

References

External links
"Feminist Critique: an argument for need for the International Women’s Film Festival", Cinema Papers, July-August 1975
 "International Women's Festival reviews", Cinema Papers, November-December 1975

1974 establishments in Australia
2001 disestablishments in Australia
Bi-monthly magazines published in Australia
Film magazines published in Australia
Defunct magazines published in Australia
Magazines established in 1974
Magazines disestablished in 2001
Magazines published in Melbourne